Kimiko Date-Krumm was the defending champion, but lost to Elena Vesnina in the first round.

Monica Puig won the title defeating Elena Vesnina in the final 7–5, 1–6, 7–5.

Seeds

Main draw

Finals

Top half

Bottom half

References 
 Main draw
 Qualifying draw

Internationaux Feminins de la Vienne - Singles